A comet tail—and coma—are features visible in comets when they are illuminated by the Sun and may become visible from Earth when a comet passes through the inner Solar System. As a comet approaches the inner Solar System, solar radiation causes the volatile materials within the comet to vaporize and stream out of the nucleus, carrying dust away with them. Separate tails are formed of dust and gases, becoming visible through different phenomena; the dust reflects sunlight directly and the gases glow from ionisation. Most comets are too faint to be visible without the aid of a telescope, but a few each decade become bright enough to be visible to the naked eye.

Tail formation 

In the outer Solar System, comets remain frozen and are extremely difficult or impossible to detect from Earth due to their small size. Statistical detections of inactive comet nuclei in the Kuiper belt have been reported from the Hubble Space Telescope observations, but these detections have been questioned, and have not yet been independently confirmed. As a comet approaches the inner Solar System, solar radiation causes the volatile materials within the comet to vaporize and stream out of the nucleus, carrying dust away with them. The streams of dust and gas thus released form a huge, extremely tenuous atmosphere around the comet called the coma, and the force exerted on the coma by the Sun's radiation pressure and solar wind cause an enormous tail to form, which points away from the Sun.

The streams of dust and gas each form their own distinct tail, pointing in slightly different directions. The tail of dust is left behind in the comet's orbit in such a manner that it often forms a curved tail called the antitail, only when it seems that it is directed towards the Sun. At the same time, the ion tail, made of gases, always points along the streamlines of the solar wind as it is strongly affected by the magnetic field of the plasma of the solar wind. The ion tail follows the magnetic field lines rather than an orbital trajectory. Parallax viewing from the Earth may sometimes mean the tails appear to point in opposite directions.

Size 
While the solid nucleus of comets is generally less than 30 km across, the coma may be larger than the Sun, and ion tails have been observed to extend .

The Ulysses spacecraft made an unexpected pass through the tail of the comet C/2006 P1 (Comet McNaught), on February 3, 2007.  Evidence of the encounter was published in the October 1, 2007, issue of The Astrophysical Journal.

Magnetosphere 
The observation of antitails contributed significantly to the discovery of solar wind. The ion tail is the result of ultraviolet radiation ejecting electrons off particles in the coma. Once the particles have been ionised, they form a plasma which in turn induces a magnetosphere around the comet. The comet and its induced magnetic field form an obstacle to outward flowing solar wind particles. The comet is supersonic relative to the solar wind, so a bow shock is formed upstream of the comet (i.e. facing the Sun), in the flow direction of the solar wind. In this bow shock, large concentrations of cometary ions (called "pick-up ions") congregate and act to "load" the solar magnetic field with plasma. The field lines "drape" around the comet forming the ion tail.  (This is similar to the formation of planetary magnetospheres.)

Tail loss 

If the ion tail loading is sufficient, then the magnetic field lines are squeezed together to the point where, at some distance along the ion tail, magnetic reconnection occurs. This leads to a "tail disconnection event". This has been observed on a number of occasions, notable among which was on the 20th of April 2007 when the ion tail of comet Encke was completely severed as the comet passed through a coronal mass ejection. This event was observed by the STEREO spacecraft. A disconnection event was also seen with C/2009 R1 (McNaught) on May 26, 2010.

Analogues 
Mercury and Venus possess similar tails caused by interaction of the solar wind with their atmospheres. On January 29, 2013, ESA scientists reported that the ionosphere of the planet Venus streams outwards in a manner similar to "the ion tail seen streaming from a comet under similar conditions." The MESSENGER mission observed magnesium and sodium being primary components of the Mercury tail.

References

External links 

 
 Comets page at NASA's Solar System Exploration
 International Comet Quarterly at Harvard.edu

Comets
Articles containing video clips